Linales is a botanical name of an order of flowering plants. The Cronquist system used this name for an order placed in subclass Rosidae with the following circumscription in 1981:

 order Linales
 family Erythroxylaceae
 family Humiriaceae
 family Ixonanthaceae
 family Hugoniaceae
 family Linaceae

The APG II system assigns the plants involved to the order Malpighiales.

References

Historically recognized angiosperm orders